Andrea Bogdani (ca. 1600–1683) was an Ottoman scholar of Albanian origin and prelate of the Roman Catholic Church.

Andrea Bogdani was born in the beginning of the 17th century  Gur i Hasit near Prizren, Ottoman Empire (modern-day Kosovo). Bogdani was educated by Jesuits at the Illyrian College in Loreto.

After he completed his education in Loreto he became a parish in Pristina.  From 1656 to 1677, when he resigned he served as Archbishop of Skopje, while from 1675 to 1677 he also served as apostolic administrator of Achrida. On 8 November 1677 Bogdani resigned because of illness. His nephew Pjetër Bogdani, one of the best-known writers of early Albanian literature succeeded him as Archbishop of Skopje in 1677. Andrea Bogdani has become known for writing the first Latin-Albanian grammar book.

Serbian historian Samardžić criticized Bogdani's works as forgery and revisionism of the Serbian medieval history. Bogdani distinguished himself as great enemy of Serbs. He considered Orthodox Christians as enemies of Catholics.

See also
Albanian literature
Culture of Albania
Llukë Bogdani

Sources

References 
 

Albanians from the Ottoman Empire
17th-century writers from the Ottoman Empire
17th-century Roman Catholic archbishops in the Ottoman Empire
17th-century Albanian people
Members of the Congregation for the Doctrine of the Faith
Anti-Serbian sentiment
1683 deaths
Year of birth uncertain
Bishops of Skopje